Ashor Sarupen (born 1 July 1988) is a South African politician who serves as a Member of the National Assembly of South Africa for the Democratic Alliance (DA), after having taken office on 22 May 2019. He is a representative of the party on both the Standing Committee on Appropriations and the Standing Committee on Finance. He also served as Chief of Staff to DA Federal Council Chairperson Helen Zille, and presently serves as her Parliamentary Counsellor. He previously served as a Member of the Gauteng Provincial Legislature from 2014 to 2019 and before that, he was the Democratic Alliance Chief Whip and City Councillor in the Ekurhuleni Metropolitan Municipality from 2011 to 2014.

Biography
Sarupen was born in Pietermaritzburg in the former Natal Province. His family soon moved to Springs. He studied at the University of the Witwatersrand where he obtained a BSc Honours Degree and then a Masters in Business Administration.

Sarupen identifies as an economic liberal and joined the DA in 2007. He started his career as a research analyst with the party in 2009. He was elected to the Ekurhuleni Metropolitan Municipality Council centred around the East Rand in 2011 and was appointed the party's Chief Whip. He was elected to the Gauteng Provincial Legislature in May 2014 and became the party's Spokesperson on Finance. He was a strategist for the DA's 2014 national election campaign in Gauteng, and fulfilled a similar role in 2019, and subsequently ran the DA's 2016 campaign in Ekurhuleni for the local government elections. He became an MP after the May 2019 general elections. He was appointed the party's spokesperson on the Standing Committee on Appropriations. In October 2019, he ran Helen Zille's campaign for DA Federal Council Chairperson. She subsequently won the election.

During the DA's 2020 Federal Congress, delegates voted to add a third deputy chairperson to the Federal Council, the party's second-highest decision-making body. Sarupen was elected in a special election on 27 November 2020 with 73% of the vote. He serves alongside James Masango and Thomas Walters.

References

External links
Ashor Sarupen – People's Assembly
Mr Ashor Nick Sarupen – Parliament of South Africa

Living people
1988 births
Members of the National Assembly of South Africa
South African politicians of Indian descent
People from Gauteng
People from Springs, Gauteng
University of the Witwatersrand alumni
Democratic Alliance (South Africa) politicians
Politicians from Gauteng
21st-century South African politicians